Nyssodectes veracruzi is a species of beetle in the family Cerambycidae. It was described by Dillon in 1955.

References

Acanthocinini
Beetles described in 1955